Perdita Emma Stevens (born 1966) is a British mathematician, theoretical computer scientist, and software engineer who holds a personal chair in the mathematics of software engineering as part of the School of Informatics at the University of Edinburgh. Her research includes work on model-driven engineering, including model transformation, model checking, and the Unified Modeling Language.

Education and career
Stevens read mathematics at the University of Cambridge, earning a bachelor's degree in 1987. She went to the University of Warwick for graduate study in abstract algebra, earning a master's degree in 1988 and completing a PhD in 1992.

After working in industry as a software engineer, Stevens joined the Department of Computer Science at the University of Edinburgh in 1984. She became a reader there in 2003 and in 2014 was given a personal chair as Professor of Mathematics of Software Engineering.

Books
Stevens is the author of books including:
Using UML: Software Engineering with Objects and Components (with Rob Pooley, Addison-Wesley, 1999; 2nd ed., 2006)
How to Write Good Programs: A Guide for Students (Cambridge University Press, 2020)

References

External links

Home page

1966 births
Living people
British mathematicians
British women mathematicians
British computer scientists
British women computer scientists
British software engineers
Alumni of the University of Cambridge
Alumni of the University of Warwick
Academics of the University of Edinburgh